The 2013–14 Saint Mary's Gaels men's basketball team represented Saint Mary's College of California during the 2013–14 NCAA Division I men's basketball season. This was head coach Randy Bennett's thirteenth season at Saint Mary's. The Gaels competed in the West Coast Conference and played their home games at the McKeon Pavilion. They finished the season 23–12, 11–7 in WCC play to finish in fourth place. They advanced to the semifinals of the WCC tournament where they lost to Gonzaga. They were invited to the National Invitation Tournament where they defeated Utah in the first round before losing in the second round to Minnesota.

Departures

Recruiting

5 newcomers will join the Gaels basketball team for the 2013-14 season. Of the 5 newcomers, 2 will redshirt the season. The newcomers are Kerry Carter, Dane Pineau, Calvin Hermanson, Emmett Naar, and transfer Joe Coleman. Naar and Coleman will redshirt the season.

The Gaels are also joined by two redshirts from 2012-13. Garrett Jackson and Treaven Duffy come off their redshirt seasons and are ready to help the Gaels try to reclaim the WCC title.

In addition to their new recruits, the Gaels enter the season with a new assistant head coach in Marty Clarke and a special assistant to the coach in Jim Shaw.

Roster

Schedule and results

|-
!colspan=9 style="background:#06315B; color:#D80024;"| Regular season

|-
!colspan=9 style="background:#06315B; color:#D80024;"| WCC tournament

|-
!colspan=9 style="background:#06315B; color:#D80024;"| NIT

Game summaries

Louisiana Tech
Series History: Louisiana Tech leads 1-0

Akron
Series History: Akron leads 1-0
Broadcasters: Carter Blackburn and Bob Valvano

North Dakota State
Series History: First Meeting

Drake
Series History: Saint Mary's leads 2-0

Alcorn State
Series History: First Meeting

Murray State
Series History: Saint Mary's leads 2-1
Broadcasters: Glen Kuiper and Dan Belluomini

Eastern Washington
Series History: First Meeting

Boise State
Series History: Boise State leads 7-4
Broadcasters: Jerry Schemmel and Joe Cravens

American University
Series History: Saint Mary's leads 2-0

Diamond Head Classic: South Carolina
Series History: First Meeting
Broadcasters: Roxy Bernstein and Miles Simon

Diamond Head Classic: Hawaii
Broadcasters: Roxy Bernstein and Miles Simon

Diamond Head Classic: George Mason
Series History: First Meeting
Broadcasters: Kanoa Leahey and Dino Gaudio

Pacific
Series History: Saint Mary's leads 66-43
Broadcasters: Barry Tompkins and Dan Belluomini

Gonzaga
Series History: Gonzaga leads series 57-27
Broadcasters: Dave Flemming and Sean Farnham

Portland
Series History: Saint Mary's leads 56-29
Broadcasters: Tom Glasgow and Bill Krueger

William Jessup
Series History: First Meeting

Santa Clara
Series History: Santa Clara leads 136-82
Broadcasters: Barry Tompkins and Dan Belluomini

San Francisco
Series History: San Francisco leads 103-72
Broadcasters: Glen Kuiper and Dan Belluomini

References

Saint Mary's
Saint Mary's Gaels men's basketball seasons
Saint Mary's